The 2015 Esiliiga B was the 3rd season of the Esiliiga B, the third-highest Estonian league for association football clubs, since its establishment in 2013. The season started on 4 March 2015 and concluded on 8 November 2015.

Starbunker won the league, finishing with 81 points and were promoted to the Esiliiga. It was their first Esiliiga B title in history.

Järve finished 2nd and were promoted to the Esiliiga. Sillamäe Kalev II finished 3rd and qualified to the promotion play-offs but subsequently withdrew.

Puuma finished 8th and qualified to the relegation play-offs but were beaten by Welco 2–5 on aggregate and relegated to the II liiga. Ararat TTÜ and Flora III were the bottom two teams and were relegated to the II liiga.

Teams

Stadia

Personnel and kits

Managerial changes

Results

League table

Result tables

First half of the season

Second half of the season

Play-offs

Promotion play-offs
Sillamäe Kalev II, who finished 3rd, were supposed to face Santos, the 8th-placed 2015 Esiliiga side for a two-legged play-off. However, the play-offs were abandoned after Sillamäe Kalev II withdrew and Santos retained their Esiliiga spot for the 2016 season.

Relegation play-offs
Puuma, who finished 8th, faced Welco, the II liiga play-offs winner. The winner on aggregate score after both matches earned entry into the 2016 Esiliiga B. Welco won 5–2 on aggregate.

First leg

Second leg

Season statistics

Top scorers

Awards

Monthly awards

Annual awards

Player of the Season
Jürgen Kuresoo was named Player of the Season.

See also
 2014–15 Estonian Cup
 2015–16 Estonian Cup
 2015 Meistriliiga
 2015 Esiliiga

References

Esiliiga B seasons
3
Estonia
Estonia